Cornea is a Romanian surname. Notable people with the surname include:

Dimitrie Cornea (1816–1884), Romanian politician
Doina Cornea (1929–2018), Romanian activist and professor
Cornel Cornea (born 1981), Romanian footballer
Gheorghe Cornea, Romanian footballer and coach

Romanian-language surnames